Karen Redman,  (née Longo; born January 8, 1953) is a Canadian politician. She was a member of the House of Commons of Canada from 1997 to 2008, representing the riding of Kitchener Centre for the Liberal Party. She served as Chief Government Whip in the 2004–05 Parliament, and was the Chief Official Opposition Whip in the 2006–08 parliament. She was defeated in the 2008 federal election. She was elected to Waterloo Regional Council in the 2014 municipal election and is now the Waterloo Regional Chair.

Life and career
Redman was born in Kitchener, Ontario. After completing high school at Eastwood Collegiate Institute, Redman went on to graduate from the University of Waterloo, receiving a Bachelor of Arts degree in English in 1974.  She subsequently worked as a writer, and was a member of the Kitchener-Waterloo Learning Disabilities Association and the Canadian Federation of University Women.  She has been an elder in Kitchener's St. Andrew's Presbyterian Church since 1991.

Politics
Redman served as a trustee on the Waterloo County Board of Education from 1988 to 1994, and was a city councillor for the Kitchener City Council and the Regional Municipality of Waterloo from 1994 to 1997.

She was first elected to parliament in the federal election of 1997, defeating former Progressive Conservative MP John Reimer by over 10,000 votes.  She was re-elected by comfortable margins in the elections of 2000, 2004, and 2006.

Redman served as parliamentary secretary to the Minister of the Environment from 2000 to 2003.  She was named Chief Government Whip and sworn into the Queen's Privy Council for Canada on July 20, 2004, an important role in a minority government situation. Following the Liberal defeat in the 2006 election, she was named Chief Opposition Whip.

In the 2008 federal election, she lost to Stephen Woodworth of the Conservative Party of Canada by 339 votes.

On November 17, 2009, upon a reconstitution of the Office of the Leader of the Official Opposition under Chief of Staff Peter Donolo, Redman was named Caucus Liaison, a role drawing on her "strong and deep ties with her former – and future – caucus colleagues."

Redman was renominated as the federal Liberal candidate for the riding of Kitchener Centre in the 2011 election, yet lost again to Conservative Stephen Woodworth.

She was elected to Waterloo Regional Council in the 2014 municipal election.  In 2018 she successfully ran for and became the chair of the Waterloo Regional Council, receiving over 62% of the votes.

Election results

See also
 List of University of Waterloo people

Notes

References

1953 births
Canadian Presbyterians
Women members of the House of Commons of Canada
Kitchener, Ontario city councillors
Liberal Party of Canada MPs
Living people
Members of the House of Commons of Canada from Ontario
Members of the King's Privy Council for Canada
University of Waterloo alumni
Women in Ontario politics
Women municipal councillors in Canada
21st-century Canadian politicians
21st-century Canadian women politicians